In economics, economic rent is any payment (in the context of a market transaction) to the owner of a factor of production in excess of the cost needed to bring that factor into production. In classical economics, economic rent is any payment made (including imputed value) or benefit received for non-produced inputs such as location (land) and for assets formed by creating official privilege over natural opportunities (e.g., patents). In the moral economy of neoclassical economics, economic rent includes income gained by labor or state beneficiaries of other "contrived" (assuming the market is natural, and does not come about by state and social contrivance) exclusivity, such as labor guilds and unofficial corruption.

Overview 
In the moral economy of the economics tradition broadly, economic rent is opposed to producer surplus, or normal profit, both of which are theorized to involve productive human action. Economic rent is also independent of opportunity cost, unlike economic profit, where opportunity cost is an essential component. Economic rent is viewed as unearned revenue  while economic profit is a narrower term describing surplus income earned by choosing between risk-adjusted alternatives.  Unlike economic profit, economic rent cannot be theoretically eliminated by competition because any actions the recipient of the income may take such as improving the object to be rented will then change the total income to contract rent.  Still, the total income is made up of economic profit (earned) plus economic rent (unearned).

For a produced commodity, economic rent may be due to the legal ownership of a patent (a politically enforced right to the use of a process or ingredient). For education and occupational licensing, it is the knowledge, performance, and ethical standards, as well as the cost of permits and licenses that are collectively controlled as to their number, regardless of the competence and willingness of those who wish to compete on price alone in the area being licensed. In regard to labor, economic rent can be created by the existence of mass education, labor laws, state social reproduction supports, democracy, guilds, and labor unions (e.g., higher pay for some workers, where collective action creates a scarcity of such workers, as opposed to an ideal condition where labor competes with other factors of production on price alone). For most other production, including agriculture and extraction, economic rent is due to a scarcity (uneven distribution) of natural resources (e.g., land, oil, or minerals).

When economic rent is privatized, the recipient of economic rent is referred to as a rentier.

By contrast, in production theory, if there is no exclusivity and there is perfect competition, there are no economic rents, as competition drives prices down to their floor.

Economic rent is different from other unearned and passive income, including contract rent. This distinction has important implications for public revenue and tax policy. As long as there is sufficient accounting profit, governments can collect a portion of economic rent for the purpose of public finance. For example, economic rent can be collected by a government as royalties or extraction fees in the case of resources such as minerals and oil and gas.

Historically, theories of rent have typically applied to rent received by different factor owners within a single economy. Hossein Mahdavy was the first to introduce the concept of "external rent", whereby one economy received rent from other economies.

Definitions
Late 1800s thinkers conceptualized economic rent as "incomes analogous to land rents in the sense of rewarding control over persistently scarce or monopolised assets, rather than labour or sacrifice." Over time, economists shifted their definition of the term. Neoclassical economists defined economic rent as "income in excess of opportunity cost or competitive price."

According to Robert Tollison (1982), economic rents are "excess returns" above the "normal levels" that are generated in competitive markets. More specifically, a rent is "a return in excess of the resource owner's opportunity cost".

Henry George, best known for his proposal for a single tax on land, defines rent as "the part of the produce that accrues to the owners of land (or other natural capabilities) by virtue of ownership" and as "the share of wealth given to landowners because they have an exclusive right to the use of those natural capabilities."

The law professors Lucian Bebchuk and Jesse Fried define the term as "extra returns that firms or individuals obtain due to their positional advantages."

In simple terms, economic rent is an excess where there is no enterprise or costs of production.

Classical rent (land rent) 
In political economy, including physiocracy, classical economics, Georgism, and other schools of economic thought, land is recognized as an inelastic factor of production. Land, in this sense, means exclusive access rights to any natural opportunity. Rent is the share paid to freeholders for allowing production on the land they control.

David Ricardo is credited with the first clear and comprehensive analysis of differential land rent and the associated economic relationships (law of rent).

Johann Heinrich von Thünen was influential in developing the spatial analysis of rents, which highlighted the importance of centrality and transport. Simply put, it was density of population, increasing the profitability of commerce and providing for the division and specialization of labor, that commanded higher municipal rents. These high rents determined that land in a central city would not be allocated to farming but be allocated instead to more profitable residential or commercial uses.

Observing that a tax on the unearned rent of land would not distort economic activities, Henry George proposed that publicly collected land rents (land value taxation) should be the primary (or only) source of public revenue, though he also advocated public ownership, taxation, and regulation of natural monopolies and monopolies of scale that cannot be eliminated by regulation.

Neoclassical Paretian rent
Neoclassical economics extends the concept of rent to include factors other than natural resource rents.
 
 "The excess earnings over the amount necessary to keep the factor in its current occupation."
 "The difference between what a factor of production is paid and how much it would need to be paid to remain in its current use."
 "A return over and above opportunity costs, or the normal return necessary to keep a resource in its current use."
The labeling of this version of rent as "Paretian" may be a misnomer in that Vilfredo Pareto, the economist for whom this kind of rent was named, may or may not have proffered any conceptual formulation of rent.

Monopoly rent
Monopoly rent refers to those economic rents derived from monopolies, which can result from (1) denial of access to an asset or (2) the unique qualities of an asset. Examples of monopoly rent include: rents associated from legally enforced knowledge monopolies derived from intellectual property like patents or copyrights; rents associated with 'de facto' monopolies of companies like Microsoft and Intel who control the underlying standards in an industry or product line (e.g. Microsoft Office); rents associated with 'natural monopolies' of public or private utilities (e.g. telephone, electricity, railways, etc.); and rents associated with network effects of platform technologies controlled by companies like Facebook, Google, or Amazon.

An antitrust probe described Google Play and Apple App Store fees as "monopoly rents".

Labour

The generalization of the concept of rent to include opportunity cost has served to highlight the role of political barriers in creating and privatizing rents. For example, a person seeking to become a member of a medieval guild makes a huge investment in training and education, which has limited potential application outside of that guild. In a competitive market, the wages of a member of the guild would be set so that the expected net return on the investment in training would be just enough to justify making the investment. In a sense, the required investment is a natural barrier to entry, discouraging some would-be members from making the necessary investment in training to enter the competitive market for the services of the guild. This is a natural "free market" self-limiting control on the number of guild members and/or the cost of training necessitated by certification. Some of those who would have opted for a particular guild may decide to join a different guild or occupation.

However, a political restriction on the number of people entering into the competitive market for services of the guild has the effect of raising the return on investments in the guild's training, especially for those already practicing, by creating an artificial scarcity of guild members. To the extent that a constraint on entrants to the guild actually increases the returns to guild members as opposed to ensuring competence, then the practice of limiting entrants to the field is a rent-seeking activity, and the excess return realized by the guild members is economic rent.

The same model explains the high wages in some modern professions that have been able to both obtain legal protection from competition and limit their membership, notably medical doctors, actuaries, and lawyers. In countries where the creation of new universities is limited by legal charter, such as the UK, it also applies to professors. It may also apply to careers that are inherently competitive in the sense that there is a fixed number of slots, such as football league positions, music charts, or urban territory for illegal drug selling. These jobs are characterised by the existence of a small number of rich members of the guild, along with a much larger surrounding of poor people competing against each other under very poor conditions as they "pay their dues" to try to join the guild. (Reference: "Freakonomics: Why do drug dealers live with their Moms?").

Terminology relating to rent
 Gross rent  Gross rent refers to the rent paid for the services of land and the capital invested on it. It consists of economic rent, interest on capital invested for improvement of land, and reward for the risk taken by the landlord in investing his or her capital.

 Scarcity rent  Scarcity rent refers to the price paid for the use of homogeneous land when its supply is limited in relation to demand. If all units of land are homogeneous but demand exceeds supply, all land will earn economic rent by virtue of its scarcity.

 Differential rent  Differential rent refers to the rent that arises owing to differences in fertility of land. The surplus that arises due to difference between the marginal and intra-marginal land is the differential rent. It is generally accrued under conditions of extensive land cultivation. The term was first proposed by David Ricardo.

 Contract rent  Contract rent refers to rent that is mutually agreed upon between the landowner and the user. It may be equal to the economic rent of the factor.

 Information rent  Information rent is rent an agent derives from having information not provided to the principal.

See also

 Georgism
 Ground rent
 Land (economics)
 List of economics topics
 Quasi-rent
 Rent-seeking
 FIRE economy (finance, insurance and real estate)
 Rentier state
 Hotelling's rule
 Law of rent
 Schumpeterian rent
 Johann Heinrich von Thünen
 Differential and absolute ground rent
 Property income
 Unearned income

References

Further reading
 
See also:

External links
 Definition of economic rent at Economist.com
 The Art of Rent, a series of seminars at Queen Mary University of London.
 Rent-Seeking Network Rent-Seeking papers by Behrooz Hassani
 Agricultural economic rent

Renting
Public choice theory
Scarcity